Lo Marianne Kauppi (born 19 April 1970) is a Swedish film and theater actress, director, and television presenter. She suffered from drug addictions and an eating disorder in her early 20s but after undergoing treatment recovered and went on to forge a successful career in theater, including performances at the Royal Dramatic Theatre in Stockholm. Kauppi has also had several acting roles in Swedish films.

Early life
Kauppi was born on 19 April 1970 in Skärholmen, a suburb of Stockholm, Sweden. In her early 20s—during her studies to become a hairdresser in London—she became addicted to drugs. She also suffered from an eating disorder.

Career
After treatment for her addictions, she attended the Swedish National Academy of Mime and Acting in Stockholm to study theater between 1999 and 2003. Since 1997, Kauppi has performed in several theater, television and movie productions. She has played at Sweden's national Royal Dramatic Theatre in Stockholm in such plays as Jösses flickor – Återkomsten ("Oh, Girls – the Return") in 2006 and in Hamlet in 2007 as Ophelia.

In 2009, she toured in the stand-up show Undercover with dancer Anna Vnuk. In 2003–05, she toured with the biographical solo show Bergsprängardottern som exploderade ("The Mountain Blaster Daughter Who Exploded"), which was later published as a book. In 2010, she debuted as a director in the play Bergsprängardöttrar at Riksteatern. She wrote the script for the play, based on conversations with interns and caregivers, at the correctional facilities in Hinseberg and Ystad. The same year she participated in the Sveriges Radio program På jakt efter kvinnan ("Searching For Woman"), a show about female orgasm and sex. In 2011 she acted in the film False Trail, opposite Peter Stormare and Rolf Lassgård, playing the character Johanna Lager, a gun expert.

In 2005, Kuppi was a presenter for the radio show Flipper broadcast on Sveriges Radio. Kauppi is the co-writer of the book Hemlös ("Homeless") and the anthology Tala om klas. In 2012, she co-presented and was the focus of the SVT show Dom kallar oss skådisar ("They Call Us Actors"). In 2015, she acted in the play Vita kränkta män ("White Offended Men"). In March 2015, the documentary film Ta plats – en film om Lo Kauppi had its premiere at Tempofestivalen in Stockholm. The documentary charts Kauppi's life and achievements.

Kauppi was the singer and guitarist of the feminist punk band Vagina Grande until they disbanded. Other band members included film director Mia Engberg and Left Party politician Josefin Brink.

Family
Kauppi is married to actor Figge Norling and the couple have a son, Lorens, born in 2009.

Awards
In 2004, she was named "Educator of the Year" by the magazine Window / ABF. She received the 2010 scholarship from the Helena Bering Memorial Fund and that same year was awarded the Jan Fridegård Prize.

Theater roles
(selective)
En månad på landet  
Bergsprängardottern som exploderade, 
Elsa-Lill in Herr Arnes penningar 
Hanna in Jösses flickor – Återkomsten 
Ophelia in Hamlet

Filmography
(selective)
1998 – Längtans blåa blomma
2002 – Cleo
2003 – Spung
2005 – Fallet G
2005 – Parasiten
2011 – False Trail
2011 – Gläntan
2012 – Vågor av längtan
2013 – Wallander – Den orolige mannen
2014 – Real Humans
2017 – In the Gap

References

External links

Living people
1970 births
Swedish film actresses
Swedish theatre directors
Swedish television hosts
Swedish women musicians
Swedish rock guitarists
Swedish punk rock musicians
Actresses from Stockholm
Swedish stage actresses
21st-century Swedish actresses
21st-century Swedish women writers
Swedish radio presenters
Musicians from Stockholm
21st-century Swedish singers
21st-century Swedish women singers
21st-century guitarists
Swedish women radio presenters
Swedish women television presenters
Women punk rock singers
21st-century women guitarists